Embryonic diapause (from late 19th century English: dia- ‘through’ + pause- 'delay') (aka delayed implantation in mammals) is an evolutionary reproductive strategy used by several animal species across a number of kingdoms, including approximately 130 different mammals, which takes place in order to ensure the survival of offspring. The process occurs at the blastocyst stage of embryo development in most species, and is characterized by a dramatic reduction or complete cessation of mitotic activity, arresting most often in the G0 or G1 phase of division. In placental embryonic diapause, the embryonic blastocyst does not immediately implant in the uterus after sexual reproduction has created the zygote, but rather remains in this non-dividing state of dormancy until conditions allow for attachment to the uterine wall to proceed as normal. As a result, the normal gestation period is extended for a species-specific time. Organisms which undergo embryonic diapause are able to synchronize the birth of all offspring to the most favorable conditions for reproductive success, irrespective of when mating took place. As timing and environment are important, many different factors can induce embryonic diapause, such as the time of year, temperature, lactation and supply of food.

Embryonic diapause is considered a relatively widespread phenomenon outside of mammals, with known presence in the reproductive cycles in many insects, nematodes, fish, and other non-mammalian vertebrates. It has been observed additionally in less than 2% of mammalian species, including certain rodents, bears, armadillos, mustelids (e.g. weasels and badgers), and marsupials (e.g. kangaroos).  Some groups only have one species that undergoes embryonic diapause, such as the roe deer in the order Artiodactyla.

Furthermore, recent studies have demonstrated even the ability for species which do not traditionally undergo embryonic discontinuous development to exhibit reversible developmental arrest, indicating some potential evolutionary significance of this phenomenon, or at least some evidence that embryonic diapause is more widespread than we currently understand.

General mechanism 
All multicellular organisms, from their conception, begin as a small number of cells and only grow and develop as those cells divide. In organisms which are capable of embryonic diapause, in non-ideal reproductive conditions, there is a cessation of cellular division which prevents the embryo from growing and maturing, delaying the maturation of the embryo until conditions are ideal enough to promote the survival of the offspring, and in some cases, the mother.

Regulation of the cell cycle as it relates to embryonic diapause has been linked to the dacapo gene in the fruit fly, responsible for inhibiting the formation of cyclin E-cdk2 complexes necessary for DNA synthesis. There is also evidence pointing to the upregulation of B cell translocation gene 1 (Btg1) in the mouse embryo during diapause, another known regulator of the cell cycle, responsible for inhibiting transition from G0/G1. Other studies have demonstrated, inversely, the lack of involvement of more common regulators of the cell cycle such as p53 within the placental model of embryonic diapause. While much of the molecular regulation involved in activating dormant blastocysts has been characterized, little widely applicable characterization is available regarding entry into diapause, and the conditions which enable a blastocyst to remain dormant. Once the embryo exits diapause arrest and resumes regular development, no adverse effects are observed.

Specifically within placental embryonic diapause, this cessation is led by the intentional failure of the blastocyst to implant in the uterine wall, which is an essential component in developmental progression in these species. Hormones relating to the failed implantation also contribute to the embryonic arrest.

Types 

There are two distinct forms of embryonic diapause, characterized by different conditions of onset. Facultative diapause occurs in response to certain environmental or metabolic stressors, such as drastic changes in temperature, feeding, or lactation. Obligate diapause occurs regularly in the reproductive cycle of the affected species, and is often associated with seasonal changes and photo-period.

Facultative diapause 
Facultative diapause is regulated by several factors, including the maternal environment and ovarian competency, the pituitary gland, and metabolic stress and lactation.

With regards to the many other regulators of this form of diapause, in placental mammals, facultative diapause is most often the result of fertilization shortly following the birth of a previous litter, The consequential pups suckling during lactation promotes prolactin to be released. This in turn reduces progesterone secretion from the corpus luteum in a pregnant female. The corpus luteum is a temporary endocrine organ that is formed from the leftover cells from the ovarian follicle in the ovary, once it has released a mature ovum. The main function of the corpus luteum is to secrete progesterone during pregnancy in order to maintain the uterine environment needed. Prolactin acting on the corpus luteum causes the progesterone level to be below optimal concentration and therefore induces embryonic facultative diapause.

Each species that undergoes facultative diapause tends to have a specific developmental stage, that is genetically determined, in which this process is initiated. This form of diapause is most well studied in rodents and marsupials but has been identified in many other species, including non-mammals. It is not clear how well the mechanisms studied for the onset, maintenance and release from facultative diapause in the rodent model apply to these other species.

Obligate diapause 
Obligate (adj: by necessity) diapause (a.k.a. seasonal delayed implantation) is a mechanism ensuring the birth of offspring is timed during optimal environmental conditions, to ensure maximal survival. The proposed mechanism is to separate conception and parturition (birth) so that each can occur at the most favourable time of year.

Obligate diapause is activated and deactivated by changes to the number of daylight hours within a day (photoperiod) and hence, occurs within specific seasons. While obligate diapause occurs in a variety of species in different groups, there are significant variations in diapause length. Skunks (Spilogale gracilis) have a diapause of around 200 days while minks (Neovision vison) only have a diapause of around 14 days.

Similarly to facultative diapause, a series of hormonal changes arrest the blastocyst development, prior to implantation, preventing continued growth of the embryo. However, in obligate diapause, the blastocyst shall enter into the dormant state in every reproductive season. This means every blastocyst a mother produces shall enter a period of diapause.

Close regulation of obligate diapause is essential for survival of the mother and offspring. Premature diapause can result in forgone growth and breeding opportunities and late diapause can result in death due to adverse conditions.

Prior to the vernal equinox, the photoperiod is less than 12 hours. This increases the production of melatonin in the pineal gland. Due to the inhibitory relationship between melatonin and prolactin, this increase in melatonin decreases prolactin secretion from the pituitary gland. The decrease in prolactin consequently decreases progesterone production in the corpus luteum, preventing development of the blastocyst. This induces embryonic diapause.

After the vernal equinox, the photoperiod is greater than 12 hours. This decreases the production of melatonin in the pineal gland and, therefore, increases the prolactin and progesterone production in the pituitary gland and corpus luteum respectively.

The increase in prolactin induces expression of the gene Odc (ornithine decarboxylase). The Odc gene produces the ODC protein, a rate-limiting enzyme in the production of the polyamine, putrescine, within the uterine environment. The presence of putrescine may indicate a role in inducing the escape of the embryo from obligate diapause.

Embryonic stem cells 
Embryonic stem cells (ESCs) have the potential to allow for further understanding of the mechanisms controlling embryonic diapause. This is because the ESCs and diapausing blastocysts having very similar transcriptome profiles. ESCs are derived from the undifferentiated inner mass cells of blastocysts of an embryo - with the capability of continual proliferation in vitro. ESCs are mostly derived from mouse models, at the point where the ESCs are at optimal efficiency and are able to enter diapause.

Both diapausing blastocysts and ESCs have transcriptome profile similarities, including downregulation of metabolism, biosynthesis and gene expression pathways. These similarities allow for the potential to use ESCs as a cellular model to identify the molecular factors which regulate embryonic diapause.

References 

 

Developmental biology

he:דיאפאוזה
pl:Ciąża przedłużona
fi:Diapaussi